Code Yellow may refer to:

 "Code Yellow", a 2019 episode from season 6 of Agents of S.H.I.E.L.D.
 "Code Yellow", a 2017 episode from season 10 of SpongeBob SquarePants